Darren Hayman (born 1 December 1970) is an English singer-songwriter and guitarist. He is best known as the writer, lead singer, and guitarist in Hefner. Since Hefner disbanded in 2002, Hayman has embarked on a prolific solo career releasing twelve albums under his own name and appearing on albums by Papernut Cambridge, Rotifer and The Great Electric. He has regularly worked with The Wave Pictures, producing an album for them, directing three of their music videos and briefly employing them as his backing band. In January 2011 Hayman recorded and released a song every day in the month of January, working with many collaborators. Hayman also paints and has exhibited his work at exhibitions about animals in space and racing dogs.

Career
Hayman first made a name for himself as the lead singer and main songwriter in UK indie rock band Hefner, who were big favourites of the late John Peel. The band split in 2002, their discography numbering four studio albums as well as a number of compilations and a live album.

Hayman's first works after Hefner were an album with The French and an EP with The Stereo Morphonium. Both were electronic projects. Hayman stated afterwards that he "spunked his career up the wall spectacularly" by following Hefner with the electronic The French.

Hayman's debut solo album Table for One was released in 2006 by Track & Field, receiving a five star review in The Guardian. It was followed in 2007 by Darren Hayman & the Secondary Modern, his second solo album, featuring a new backing band. The album featured guest appearances from singer-songwriter John Howard and Pete Astor (of The Loft and The Weather Prophets fame). Hayman employed The Wave Pictures as his backing band for a short tour in 2007, resulting in the live album Madrid, credited to Darren Hayman & The Wave Pictures.

In 2008 Hayman fronted self-proclaimed "East London bluegrass" outfit Hayman, Watkins, Trout And Lee, releasing an eponymous album recorded around Hayman's kitchen table over two days. The band is named after Dave Watkins from Hayman's band The Secondary Modern, John Lee from B-Monster and Simon Trought (spelled Trout here) from Tompaulin. However, Lee and Trought do not appear on the album, which instead features David Tattersal from The Wave Pictures and fiddle player Dan Mayfield. Also in 2008, Hayman released the compilation Great British Holiday EPs, which collects the EPs Caravan Songs (2005), Ukulele Songs from the North Devon Coast (2006), Eastbourne Lights (2006) and Minehead (2007) which were recorded in the EPs' titular locations by Hayman during holidays. Hayman states that the collection is about "a love of days gone by". This was followed by the release of a further EP called Songs For Harmonium And Drum Machine for the p572 label in Canada, with all the songs titled after and written about the Brat Pack members Andrew McCarthy, Judd Nelson, Emilio Estevez and Ally Sheedy.

In 2009, Hayman released the first part of his "Essex Trilogy", Pram Town, named after Harlow, in Essex, which was given the Pram Town name by the Daily Mirror in the 1950s. The album is a 'folk-opera' concerning a relationship between a man and a woman who is out of his league, Hayman stating that the album "is a set of songs about someone who doesn't escape. It’s about how pride can lose you love. It's about high and low ambition and the gap between".

Essex Arms, the second installment in the "Essex Trilogy", was released 2010, his first release on the Fortuna Pop! record label. It is an album concerning Essex on a larger scale than Pram Town, with songs about factories closing, dogging hot spots and the littered countryside, featuring guest appearances from Emmy the Great and Fanfarlo.

During January 2011 Hayman recorded and released a song every day of the month, as well as keeping a video diary each day, making them available free of charge. The songs featured different collaborators on different days, including Elizabeth Morris from Allo Darlin', The Wave Pictures, Jack Hayter and Ballboy. Hayman states about the project: "I get tired of having to wait to release songs and records. I thought this would be a way to solve the release bottleneck. I thought it would be funny and at least a little interesting". Following the January project, Hayman curated the Vostok 5 exhibition at the Outside world Gallery in London which ran from 1 to 7 September 2011. The exhibition was "for people who love rockets and animals" according to Hayman and featured songs and paintings by Hayman, Paul Rains (Allo Darlin'), Duncan Barrett (Tigercats), Robert Rotifer (Rotifer) and Sarah Lippet (Fever Dream) about animals and humans that have travelled to space, including soviet space dogs, Alexei Leonov, Wernher von Braun and Sergei Korolev. Hayman then released The Green and the Grey (2011), an album featuring additional tracks from the Essex Arms sessions and produced the album Beer in the Breakers (2011) for The Wave Pictures.
 Still in 2011, Hayman's next solo album, The Ship's Piano, was released, an album recorded entirely on a 1933 fold-away piano, the type of piano often found "crammed into the corners of seafaring parlours". Hayman told Clash that the piano is the first instrument he owned that was older than he was and that the title song is about an imagined history of the piano's former owners. The record was written while Hayman was recovering from a head injury "which rendered him extra sensitive to sound". In December 2011 The Hosting Couple by Rotifer was released, with whom Hayman was the bass player at the time, alongside frontman Robert Rotifer and former Thrashing Dove Ian Button. 
 The album was produced by Wreckless Eric and released on Edwyn Collins' AED Records. Rotifer states of Hayman that "it was always quite funny playing with Darren Hayman, because he is not really a bass player. He has this tiny toy bass, a little Fender, and he had this really idiosyncratic way of playing". For his final projects in 2011, Hayman curated a musical advent calendar in association with Fika Recordings, where two festive songs were made available for free every day of the advent period, and released the Christmas EP, Christmas in Haworth.

In January 2012, one year after recording a song a day, Hayman released an album of all the tracks called January Songs, each individual CD coming with its own hand-drawn cover art. This was followed a few months later by The Shit Piano, a re-recording of The Ship's Piano using vintage Casio keyboards. The album was recorded in one day, and is influenced by "the tradition of remixes and ... dub versions of albums", Hayman stating that the title is based on a pun and that the album "definitely isn't 'shit' on purpose". In April 2012 Hayman directed the music video for The Wave Pictures single "Spaghetti". Later that year, in August 2012,  Lido, an instrumental album with songs named after, inspired by and often featuring field recordings of lidos in the UK was released. Included are songs about lidos that are still open, such as London Fields and the Brockwell Lido, but also ones that have closed, such as the Brentwood lido. In October 2012 Hayman completed his "Essex Trilogy" with the release of The Violence, a double album mostly concerned with the 17th century Essex Witch Trials conducted by Matthew Hopkins. Other songs on the album cover topical events, such as "Henrietta Maria" which is sung from the perspective of Charles I as he serenades Henrietta Maria of France. Hayman states that he found parallels with those eras and modern times, stating: "I make some sort of connection between how in times of hardship or war we tend to distrust the outsider, how there is a fear and mistrust in a community".

Continuing further with the historical theme Hayman released the Four Queens EP in April 2013. This contained, alongside "Henrietta Maria" from The Violence, songs about three other queens; Elizabeth I, Lady Jane Grey and Eleanor Of Aquitaine. It was followed by the Bugbears album in July 2013. The album is considered a companion piece to The Violence and contains updated versions of 17th-century folk songs with new lyrics, including "Sir Thomas Fairfax March", about Thomas Fairfax. Starting that same month, Hayman played the first of a one-year run of shows, entitled 'Darren Hayman's Occupation', at the Vortex Jazz Club in London. The shows were all themed and featured support slots from a variety of performers, such as Chris T-T, The Pictish Trail, Robin Ince and Stewart Lee, amongst many others. Hayman directed two more videos for The Wave Pictures in October 2013; "Lisbon", which stars the fathers of the band members in place of their sons, and "Red Cloud Road". In November 2013, for the Independent Label Market, Hayman released the Blue House EP.

2014 activities included Hayman contributing seven paintings of greyhounds that had raced at the Walthamstow Dog Track to the Zoology exhibition at the E17 Art House in May. Papernut Cambridge, Ian Button's band who Hayman is a member of, alongside Button and Mat Flint (both also in Death in Vegas), Ralegh Long and Jack Hayter, amongst others, released their debut album Cambridge Nutflake in December 2013. Their second album, There's No Underground followed soon after in October 2014. EP 1, the debut recording by The Great Electric, was another release that month, on Static Caravan Recordings. Hayman plays the synthesizer for The Great Electric, alongside band members Malcolm Doherty, Rob Hyde, Duncan Hemphill and Pete Gofton.

In February 2015 Hayman released his next album Chants for Socialists, setting the poetry of William Morris to music. Throughout early 2015 Hayman released three EPs as Brute Love, an improvisational synthesizer band Hayman formed with Emma Winston. In the summer of 2015 Hayman released Folk Lullabies for Children and the Childless, a limited edition cassette with versions of lullabies from around the world. This was followed in November 2015 by Hayman's next album Florence, an album recorded whilst Hayman was on holiday and his first album without any collaborators.

On 3 June 2016 Hayman released the first of three albums of work inspired by and written in-situ at Thankful Villages - settlements in England and Wales from which all their then-members of the armed forces survived World War I.

Hayman asked Emma Kupa (Standard Fare, Mammoth Penguins) to sing on his 2013 single Boy, Look At What You Can’t Have Now. Following this collaboration, they began to co-write a series of duets: these were released on a self-titled album as The Hayman Kupa Band on 21 July 2017.

Discography
See also the discographies for Hefner and The French

Studio albums
 Table for One (2006, Track & Field)
 Darren Hayman & the Secondary Modern (2007, Track & Field)
 Pram Town (2009, Track & Field)
 Essex Arms (2010, Fortuna Pop!)
 The Ship's Piano (2011, Fortuna Pop!)
 The Green and the Grey (2011, Belka)
 January Songs (2012, Belka)
 The Shit Piano (2012, Belka)
 Lido (2012, Where It's at Is Where You Are)
 The Violence (2012, Fortuna Pop!)
 Bugbears (2013, Fika Recordings)
 Chants for Socialists (2015, Where It's at Is Where You Are)
 Folk Lullabies for Children and the Childless (2015, no label)
 Florence (2015, Fika Recordings)
 Thankful Villages Volume 1 (2016, Rivertones)
 Thankful Villages Volume 2 (2017, Rivertones)
 Thankful Villages Volume 3 (2018, Belka)
 12 Astronauts (2019, Where It's at Is Where You Are)
 Songs of High Altitude (download only; 2019, no label)
 I Can Travel Through Time (10 songs on 33 rpm 7"; 2020, Formosa Punk)
 Home Time (2020, Fika Recordings)
 You Will Not Die (2022, Fika Recordings)

EPs
 Caravan Songs (2005, Static Caravan)
 Cortinaland (2005, Acuarela)
 Ukulele Songs From the North Devon Coast (2006, Static Caravan)
 Eastbourne Lights (2007, Static Caravan)
 Table for One: the Dessert Menu (2007, Track & Field)
 Minehead (2007, Static Caravan)
 Songs for Harmonium and Drum Machine (2008, P572)
 Losing My Glue (2009, Track & Field)
 I Taught You How to Dance (2011, Fortuna Pop!)
 Christmas in Haworth (2011, Fika Recordings)
 The Four Queens (2013, Fortuna Pop!)
 Blue House (2013, Belka)
 Wembley Eiffel Tower (2014, Glass Reservoir)
 Dog E.P. (2014, Where It's At is Where You Are)

Singles
 Bad Policewoman/Your Heart (2007, Unpopular)
 Old Man Don't Waste Your Time / I Don't Want To Get Used To It (2013, Where It's At is Where You Are)
 Boy, Look At What You Can't Have Now / Outside, Looking In (2013, Fortuna Pop!)
 Someone To Care For / What Happened (2016, Static Caravan)
 I've Been A Bad, Bad Boy / Big Big Deal (2016, Fortuna Pop!)

Compilations
 Great British Holiday EPs (2008, Belka)

Other projects

Studio albums
 Hayman, Watkins, Trout & Lee – as Hayman, Watkins, Trout & Lee (2008, Fortuna Pop!)
 The Hosting Couple – Rotifer (2012, AED Records)
 Cambridge Nutflake – Papernut Cambridge (2013, Gare du Nord Records)
 There's No Underground – Papernut Cambridge (2014, Gare du Nord Records)
 The Hayman Kupa Band – The Hayman Kupa Band (2017, Fika Recordings)

EPs
 The Stereo Morphonium EP – as The Stereo Morphonium (2005, Filthy Little Angels)
 Vostok 5 – Various (Hayman curates and contributes two songs) (2012, Strelka Records)
 EP 1 – The Great Electric (2014, Static Caravan)
 Brute Love 01 – Brute Love (2015)
 Brute Love 02 – Brute Love (2015)
 Brute Love 03 – Brute Love (2015)

Live albums
 Madrid – as Darren Hayman & The Wave Pictures (2009, Belka)

References

External links

1970 births
Living people
English male singer-songwriters
People from Brentwood, Essex
21st-century English singers
21st-century British male singers